Khwajeh Nizam al-Din Ubayd Allah al-Zakani (d. 1370), better known as Ubayd Zakani was a Persian poet of the Mongol era, regarded as one of the best satirists in Persian literature. His most famous work is Mush-o Gorbeh ("Mouse and Cat"), a political satire, which attacks religious hypocrisy. Although a highly popular figure, Ubayd's work has received little attention until recently, due to provoking and bawdy texts in the majority of his works. He has been compared to the French Enlightenment writer Voltaire (d. 1778).

Background
Ubayd was from the Zakani family, which was descended from the Banu Khafaja, an Arab tribe that had immigrated to Qazvin in northern Iran at the start of the Islamic era. The Zakani family was made up of two branches; one being notable for its field in religion, whilst the other consisted of landowners and bureaucrats, to which Ubayd belonged. Ubayd himself was born in Qazvin, most likely before 1319. Iran was then under Mongol (Ilkhanate) rule, widely considered to be the golden age of Persian poetry.

Life 

The contemporary Persian writer Hamdallah Mustawfi, who was a fellow Qazvini, describes Ubayd in his Tarikh-i guzida (1329) as a gifted poet and a well-educated writer. This comment was made in the same year as the composition of Nawādir al-amṯāl, one of Ubayd's first works. The book, written in Arabic, was a compilation of proverbs of prophets and sages. After the fall of the Ilkhanate in 1335, Ubayd fled to Shiraz in Fars, then under Injuid control. There he joined the court of the Injuid ruler Abu Ishaq Inju, to whom he wrote a considerable segment of his panegyrics, and also his acclaimed Ushshaq-nama (1350), a masnavi mixed with ghazals. Ubayd also dedicated some of his poems to Abu Ishaq Inju's minister Rukn al-din Amid al-Mulk. 

Ubayd was part of Abu Ishaq Inju's circle of poets, which included an elder Khwaju Kermani and a young Hafez. However, in 1357, the Muzaffarid ruler Mubariz al-Din Muhammad captured Shiraz, and had Abu Ishaq Inju executed. Ubayd was a result forced to leave Shiraz, most likely leaving for the domains of the Jalayirid ruler Shaykh Uways Jalayir, to whom he has dedicated qasidas to. Ubayd also wrote an elegy for the deceased Abu Ishaq Inju, who had been his most important patron. He later returned to Shiraz during the reign of Mubariz al-Din Muhammad's son and successor Shah Shoja Mozaffari, to whom he dedicated several panegyrics. Ubayd had little love for his hometown Qazvin, preferring Shiraz instead. He died sometime between 1369–1371, possibly in Shiraz.

Literary work 
Most of Ubayd's work is in Persian, although some of it is in Arabic as well, demonstrating his high education. His satire is generally divided into three topics; religion, politics, and ethics. In regards to religion, he criticizes the clergy for their hypocrisy, such as meddling in other people's lives and especially hijacking the right to reprehend freethinkers. Ubayd's most famous work is Mush-o Gorbeh ("Mouse and Cat"), a political satire, which attacks religious hypocrisy. The work was considered risky, due to being made during a time where one could face death for criticizing religion.

Legacy 
Ubayd is regarded as one of the best satirists in Persian literature. He has been compared to the French Enlightenment writer Voltaire (d. 1778). According to the British orientalist Edward Granville Browne, Ubayd was "perhaps the most remarkable parodist and satirical writer produced by Persia." Ubayd is along with Iraj Mirza (d. 1926) considered the most illustrious Iranian satirists.

References

Sources 
 
  

 
 

14th-century Persian-language poets
14th-century writers
Censorship in the arts
Obscenity controversies in literature
Iranian satirists
People from Qazvin
1371 deaths
Year of birth uncertain
14th-century Iranian people
Jalayirid-period poets
Ilkhanate-period poets
Injuid-period poets
Iranian people of Arab descent